The 69th Assembly District of Wisconsin is one of 99 districts in the Wisconsin State Assembly.  Located in north-central Wisconsin, the district comprises about half of Clark County as well as parts of northern Jackson County, southwest Marathon County, northwest Wood County, including most of the city of Marshfield.  The district also includes the cities of Abbotsford, Black River Falls, and Neillsville. The district is represented by Republican Donna Rozar, since January 2021.

The 69th Assembly District is located within Wisconsin's 23rd Senate district, along with the 67th and 68th Assembly districts.

List of past representatives

References 

Wisconsin State Assembly districts
Clark County, Wisconsin
Marathon County, Wisconsin
Wood County, Wisconsin